Callisto is a genus of moths in the family Gracillariidae.

Species
 Callisto albicinctella Kuznetzov, 1979
 Callisto basistrigella Huemer, Deutsch & Triberti, 2015
 Callisto coffeella (Zetterstedt, 1839)
 Callisto denticulella (Thunberg, 1794)
 Callisto elegantella Kuznetzov, 1979
 Callisto insperatella (Nickerl, 1864)
 Callisto pfaffenzelleri (Frey, 1856)

External links
 Global Taxonomic Database of Gracillariidae (Lepidoptera)
 
 

Gracillariinae
Gracillarioidea genera